Görtz, Goertz or Görts is a surname. Notable people with the surname include:

Albrecht von Goertz (1914–2006), German automobile designer
Allie Goertz, American musician known for her satirical songs
Armin Görtz (born 1959), German former footballer
Dave Goertz (born 1965), Canadian ice hockey defenceman
Georg Heinrich von Görtz, Baron of Schlitz (1668–1719), diplomat in Swedish service
Hermann Görtz (1890–1947), German spy in Britain and Ireland before and during World War II
Maria Johanna Görtz (1783–1853), Swedish artist and a member of the Royal Swedish Academy of Arts
Raymond Goertz, American roboticist
Roman Görtz (born 1974), retired German footballer
Ulrich Görtz (born 1973), German mathematician
Werner Görts (born 1942), retired German football player

German-language surnames